Motorvision is a home video by the American grunge band Soundgarden. It was released on November 17, 1992.

Overview 
It features eight songs performed live at the Paramount Theatre in Seattle, Washington on March 5 and 6, 1992, during the Badmotorfinger tour. AllMusic gave it three out of a possible five stars. AllMusic staff writer Greg Prato said, "Motorvision is an excellent sample of Soundgarden in concert." Motorvision was originally released on VHS only.

An official DVD version was finally made available, with various live videos added as extras, in November 2016 as part of the Badmotorfinger 25th anniversary Super Deluxe edition box set.

The video features candid footage of the band and people associated with it, including Sub Pop co-founders Bruce Pavitt and Jonathan Poneman. Before the first song begins, the band is introduced on stage by a clown, J. P. Patches. The performance of "Slaves & Bulldozers" includes lyrics from Pearl Jam's "Alive" and The Doobie Brothers' "Jesus Is Just Alright".

Track listing 
 "Searching with My Good Eye Closed"
 "Rusty Cage"
 "Outshined"
 "Little Joe"
 "Mind Riot"
 "Room a Thousand Years Wide"
 "Jesus Christ Pose"
 "Slaves & Bulldozers"

Personnel 
Soundgarden
 Matt Cameron – drums
 Chris Cornell – lead vocals, rhythm guitar (2, 4, 5, 7 & 8)
 Ben Shepherd – bass
 Kim Thayil – lead guitar
 Scott Granlund – tenor saxophone
 Denney Goodhew – baritone saxophone
Production
 Kevin Kerslake – film director

Chart positions

References

External links 
 
 

Soundgarden video albums
1992 live albums
1992 video albums
Live video albums
Soundgarden live albums
A&M Records live albums
A&M Records video albums